Ingebjørg Saglien Bråten (born 20 September 1999) is a Norwegian ski jumper.

She participated at the FIS Nordic World Ski Championships 2019, winning a bronze medal in the team competition.

References

External links

1999 births
Living people
People from Etnedal
Norwegian female ski jumpers
FIS Nordic World Ski Championships medalists in ski jumping
Sportspeople from Innlandet